William Yates Atkinson (November 11, 1854 – August 8, 1899), was the 55th Governor of Georgia from 1894 to 1898.

Early life
Atkinson was born in the Oakland community in Meriwether County, Georgia on November 11, 1854. He graduated from the University of Georgia with an LL.B in 1877. He married Susan Cobb Milton, granddaughter of Florida Governor John Milton, in 1880.

Political life
After graduating from the University of Georgia, Atkinson began practicing law in Newnan. Atkinson was the solicitor of the Coweta Superior Court circuit. He then represented Coweta County as a member of the Georgia House of Representatives (1886–94), where he was the speaker, or presiding officer, during the last two years. As a state representative, he introduced a bill that established the Georgia Normal and Industrial College, which later became Georgia College and State University in Milledgeville, Georgia. He was also the Georgia Democratic Party state chair from 1890 to 1892.

Atkinson won the 1894 election and was elected Governor of Georgia. He was reelected to a second term in 1896. During his administration, he hired the first woman salaried employee in state government, Helen Dortch, as assistant state librarian. In 1897, he vetoed a law that would have prohibited football in the state, due in part to an impassioned letter from Rosalind Burns Gammon, whose son's death had initiated the anti-football legislation. He was vehement in his opposition to the practice of lynching.

Atkinson was mentioned by William Henry Holtzclaw, later founder of Utica Institute in Mississippi, as giving him the money he needed to go back to Tuskegee Institute for college - as well as a kindly lecture on the advisability of staying out of politics.

After his two terms as governor, Atkinson bravely confronted the mob in the infamous Sam Hose lynching and tried to get them to allow the legal justice system to take its course. He was unsuccessful, however, and Hose was lynched soon after Atkinson confronted the mob.

Death and legacy

Atkinson died on August 8, 1899 at the age of 44. He is buried in Oak Hill Cemetery in Newnan. Atkinson County, Georgia is named for him.

His son, William Yates Atkinson Jr., was the Georgia Democratic state chair in 1942 as well as a Georgia state Supreme Court justice from 1943 to 1948.

Atkinson Hall, on the campus of Georgia College and State University, is named for him.

See also

 List of speakers of the Georgia House of Representatives

References

This Day in Georgia History:November 11th, Ed Jackson and Charly Pou, Carl Vinson Institute of Government, The University of Georgia

External links

 Hulett, Keith. "William Y. Atkinson (1854-1899)." New Georgia Encyclopedia. September 25, 2014. Web. June 17, 2016.
Portrait of William Yates Atkinson

Picture of Georgia Governor William Yates Atkinson (foreground) with his military staff on horseback at the corner of Peachtree Street and Cain Street (now Andrew Young International Boulevard) in downtown Atlanta, Georgia. Atlanta History Photograph Collection, Atlanta History Center, presented in the Digital Library of Georgia. Web. June 17, 2016.

1854 births
1899 deaths
Democratic Party governors of Georgia (U.S. state)
People from Newnan, Georgia
University of Georgia alumni
19th-century American politicians
Speakers of the Georgia House of Representatives
Democratic Party members of the Georgia House of Representatives
State political party chairs of Georgia (U.S. state)